This is a list of amphibians and reptiles found in the British overseas territory of Anguilla, located in the Lesser Antilles chain in the Caribbean.  It comprises the main island of Anguilla, and many much smaller islands and cays that have no permanent human population.

Amphibians
There are two species of amphibian on Anguilla, both of which were introduced.

Frogs (Anura)

Reptiles
Including marine turtles and introduced species, there are 19 reptile species reported on Anguilla.  Two are endemic and are restricted to small, uninhabited satellite islands: Censky's Ameiva (Pholidoscelis corax) and the Sombrero Ameiva (Pholidoscelis corvina).

Turtles (Testudines)

Lizards and snakes (Squamata)

Notes

References
Note: All species listed above are supported by Malhotra & Thorpe 1999, unless otherwise cited.

.

 Amphibians
 Reptiles
Anguilla
Anguilla
Amphibians and reptiles
Anguilla